The Bangsamoro Transition Authority is the interim regional government of the Bangsamoro Autonomous Region of the Philippines and has executive and legislative powers over the region.

History

With the ratification of the Bangsamoro Organic Law following a plebiscite on January 21, 2019, the abolition process of the Autonomous Region in Muslim Mindanao (ARMM) began, paving way for the formal creation of the Bangsamoro Autonomous Region. Under the law, a transition body, the Bangsamoro Transition Authority (BTA), is to be organized pending the election of the new region's government officials in 2022.

It was planned that the BTA will be constituted in February 2019. It is projected that the transition body would be composed of a total of 105 members (80 appointed members and 25 elected officials of the ARMM) until June 30, 2019. After that date, the body would be composed of only 80 members.

Until the BTA was constituted, Section 5 of Article XVI of the Bangsamoro Organic Law provided for a caretaker body consisting of the same 25 ARMM officials as well as the original 20 members of the Bangsamoro Transition Commission.

The 80 appointed members of the BTA took their oath on February 22, 2019, while the official turnover of the ARMM to the Bangsamoro Autonomous Region occurred on February 26, 2019. The transition authority also has legislative function during the transition period, with the BTA first convening as the interim Bangsamoro Parliament on March 29, 2019.

Transition work

During the transition period, the BTA as the interim parliament had obligations to complete.

Transition plan
The Bangsamoro Organic Law mandates the interim chief minister to submit to the BTA within the first 60 days of the transition period a transition plan containing the Bangsamoro government's "proposed organizational plan, as well as, the schedule for implementation therefor." It also requires the approval or action of the BTA on the proposed plan within 10 days upon its submission. If there is failure to act upon the plan within 10 days, the plan would be automatically approved and implemented within 15 days. According to Chief Minister Murad Ebrahim, the start of the transition period for the purpose of submitting the transition plan was on March 29, or the inaugural session of the interim parliament. The plan's deadline was stated to be in May 2019.

The transition plan was then submitted to the Bangsamoro Parliament on June 17, 2019, and was approved by the legislature the following day.

Priority laws
The BTA as the interim Bangsamoro parliament is also required to pass into law "priority legislation" enumerated in the Bangsamoro Organic Law. Following the fourth session of the parliament, eight ad hoc committees were formed to draft the priority legislations.

Interim Parliament
The Bangsamoro Transition Authority has acted as the Bangsamoro Parliament under an interim basis. There has been two meetings under the BTA acting as the interim parliament; the 1st (2019–2022) and the 2nd parliaments (2022–present)

See also
Cabinet of Murad Ebrahim

Notes

References

 
Politics of Bangsamoro
2019 establishments in the Philippines